The 2016 ACBS Asian Snooker Championship was an amateur snooker tournament that is taking place from 16 April to 23 April 2016 in Doha, Qatar. It is the 32nd edition of the ACBS Asian Snooker Championship and also doubles as a qualification event for the World Snooker Tour.

The tournament was won by the number 13 seed Kritsanut Lertsattayathorn of Thailand who defeated Mohamed Shehab 6–2 in the final to win the championship, as a result Lertsattayathorn was given a two-year card on the professional World Snooker Tour for the 2016/2017 and 2017/2018 seasons.

Results

Round 1
Best of 7 frames

References

2016 in snooker
Snooker amateur tournaments
Sports competitions in Doha
2016 in Qatari sport
International sports competitions hosted by Qatar
ACBS Asian Snooker Championship